Re-Machined: A Tribute to Deep Purple's Machine Head is a 2012 tribute album that features a variety of hard rock and heavy metal bands covering songs written by Deep Purple. Groups included on the multi-artist collection include Black Label Society and Iron Maiden among others. Picking up some commercial success, the work hit the #41 slot on Billboard Top Independent Albums chart and additionally received critical praise from publications such as Allmusic.

As part of the 40th anniversary celebrations of Deep Purple's 1972 release Machine Head, Re-Machined was released on September 25, 2012 by Eagle Rock Entertainment.

Recording
Re-Machined features mostly specially recorded tracks from former Deep Purple Mk III member Glenn Hughes with Chad Smith of Red Hot Chili Peppers, Iron Maiden, Metallica, Chickenfoot,  Steve Vai,  Black Label Society, Carlos Santana and Papa Roach vocalist Jacoby Shaddix - their version of "Smoke on the Water" has previously been released on the Santana album Guitar Heaven, Jimmy Barnes & Joe Bonamassa, and the supergroup Kings of Chaos featuring Def Leppard vocalist Joe Elliott, Steve Stevens, and former Guns N' Roses members  Duff McKagan and Matt Sorum.

There are two wildly differing versions of the album's most famous track "Smoke on the Water", one from Carlos Santana with vocals by Jacoby Shaddix and one from Flaming Lips, and Metallica have contributed their own special take on "When A Blind Man Cries", a track recorded at the Machine Head sessions, but originally released as the B-side to "Never Before".

Reception

Since its release, the album has been met with mostly positive reviews. William Clark of Guitar International said, "This Remachined Tribute is a re-launch of one of the very best albums of all time and one that fields such a diverse and amazing set of guitar talents that I have no reservations – none – recommending this to followers of Deep Purple".

Track listing

See also 
 Various – Re-Machined A Tribute To Deep Purple's Machine Head (credits by track)
2012 in American music / 2012 in British music

References 

2012 compilation albums
Eagle Rock Entertainment albums
Hard rock compilation albums
Deep Purple tribute albums